Jane Ellen Harrison (9 September 1850 – 15 April 1928) was a British classical scholar and linguist.  Harrison is one of the founders, with Karl Kerenyi and Walter Burkert, of modern studies in Ancient Greek religion and mythology.  She applied 19th-century archaeological discoveries to the interpretation of ancient Greek religion in ways that have become standard. She has also been credited with being the first woman to obtain a post in England as a ‘career academic’. Harrison argued for women's suffrage but thought she would never want to vote herself. Ellen Wordsworth Crofts, later second wife of Sir Francis Darwin, was Jane Harrison's best friend from her student days at Newnham, and during the period from 1898 to her death in 1928.

Life and career
Harrison was born in Cottingham, Yorkshire on 9 September 1850 to Charles and Elizabeth Harrison. Her mother died of puerperal fever shortly after she was born and she was educated by a series of governesses. Her governesses taught her German, Latin, Ancient Greek and Hebrew, but she later expanded her knowledge to about sixteen languages, including Russian.

Harrison spent most of her professional life at Newnham College, the progressive, recently established college for women at Cambridge. At Newnham, one of her students was Eugenie Sellers, the writer and poet, with whom she lived in England and later in Paris and had a relationship with as her partner.  Mary Beard described Harrison as '... the first woman in England to become an academic, in the fully professional sense – an ambitious, full-time, salaried, university researcher and lecturer'.

Between 1880 and 1897 Harrison studied Greek art and archaeology at the British Museum under Sir Charles Newton. Harrison then supported herself lecturing at the museum and at schools (mostly private boy's schools). Her lectures became widely popular and 1,600 people ended up attending her Glasgow lecture on Athenian gravestones. She travelled to Italy and Germany, where she met the scholar from Prague, Wilhelm Klein. Klein introduced her to Wilhelm Dörpfeld who invited her to participate in his archaeological tours in Greece. Her early book The Odyssey in Art and Literature then appeared in 1882. Harrison met the scholar D. S. MacColl, who supposedly asked her to marry him and she declined. Harrison then suffered a severe depression and started to study the more primitive areas of Greek art in an attempt to cure herself.

In 1888 Harrison began to publish in the periodical that Oscar Wilde was editing called The Woman's World on "The Pictures of Sappho." Harrison also ended up translating Mythologie figurée de la Grèce (1883) by Maxime Collignon as well as providing personal commentary to selections of Pausanias, Mythology & Monuments of Ancient Athens by Margaret Verrall in the same year. These two major works caused Harrison to be awarded honorary degrees from the universities of Durham (1897) and Aberdeen (1895).

Harrison was then engaged to marry the scholar R. A. Neil, but he died suddenly of appendicitis in 1901 before they could marry.

Harrison became the central figure of the group known as the Cambridge Ritualists. In 1903 her book Prolegomena on the Study of Greek Religion appeared. Harrison became close to Francis MacDonald Cornford (1874–1943), and when he married in 1909 she became extremely upset. She then made a new friendship with Hope Mirrlees, whom she referred to as her "spiritual daughter".

Harrison retired from Newnham in 1922 and then moved to Paris to live with Mirrlees. She and Mirrlees returned to London in 1925 where she was able to publish her memoirs through Leonard and Virginia Woolf's press, The Hogarth Press. She lived three more years, to the age of 77, and died at her house in Bloomsbury. She is now buried in St Marylebone Cemetery, East Finchley.

Harrison was an atheist.

Suffragist

Harrison was, at least ideologically, a moderate suffragist. Rather than support women's suffrage by protesting, Harrison applied her scholarship in anthropology to defend women's right to vote.  In responding to an anti-suffragist critic, Harrison demonstrates this moderate ideology:

[The Women's Movement] is not an attempt to arrogate man's prerogative of manhood; it is not even an attempt to assert and emphasize women's privilege of womanhood; it is simply the demand that in the life of woman, as in the life of man, space and liberty shall be found for a thing bigger than either manhood or womanhood – for humanity. (84–85, Alpha and Omega)

To this end, Harrison's motto was Terence's homo sum; humani nihil mihi alienum est ("I am a human being; nothing that is human do I account alien.")

Scholarship

Harrison began formal study at Cheltenham Ladies' College, where she gained a Certificate, and, in 1874, continued her studies in the classics at Cambridge University's Newnham College.  Her early work earned Harrison two honorary doctorates, an LLD from University of Aberdeen in 1895 and DLitt from the University of Durham in 1897.  This recognition afforded Harrison the opportunity to return to Newnham College as a lecturer in 1898, and her position was renewed continuously until Harrison retired in 1922. She had been a candidate for the Yates Professor of Classical Art and Archaeology at University College London after Reginald Stuart Poole had died in 1895. The hiring committee had recommended Harrison to the position, but that decision was blocked by Flinders Petrie in favor of Ernest Gardner. Petrie argued that while Harrison was an expert on religion, she didn't have the knowledge base Gardner did, so he got the job and worked closely with Petrie for 30 years.

Early work

Harrison's first monograph, in 1882, drew on the thesis that both Homer's Odyssey and motifs of the Greek vase-painters were drawing upon similar deep sources for mythology, the opinion that had not been common in earlier classical archaeology, that the repertory of vase-painters offered some unusual commentaries on myth and ritual.

Her approach in her great work, Prolegomena to the Study of Greek Religion (1903), was to proceed from the ritual to the myth it inspired: "In theology facts are harder to seek, truth more difficult to formulate than in ritual." Thus she began her book with analyses of the best-known of the Athenian festivals: Anthesteria, harvest festivals Thargelia, Plynteria, and the women's festivals, in which she detected many primitive survivals, Arrophoria, Skirophoria, Stenia and Haloa.

The importance of this work is her observation that the status of goddesses in the Greek pantheon was higher than the status of women in Greek society, indicating a religion previous to the Olympian in which women had a higher status, and providing a development on Bachofen's work on matriarchy.

Cultural evolution (or social Darwinism)

Harrison alluded to and commented on the cultural applications of Charles Darwin's work.  Harrison and her generation depended upon anthropologist Edward Burnett Tylor (who was himself influenced by Darwin and evolutionary ideas) for some new themes of cultural evolution, especially his 1871 work, Primitive Culture: researches into the development of mythology, philosophy, religion, language, art, and custom.  After a socially Darwinian analysis of the origins of religion, Harrison argues that religiosity is anti-intellectual and dogmatic, yet she defended the cultural necessity of religion and mysticism.  In her essay The Influence of Darwinism on the Study of Religion (1909), Harrison concluded:

Every dogma religion has hitherto produced is probably false, but for all that the religious or mystical spirit may be the only way of apprehending some things, and these of enormous importance. It may also be that the contents of this mystical apprehension cannot be put into language without being falsified and misstated, that they have rather to be felt and lived than uttered and intellectually analyzed; yet they are somehow true and necessary to life. (176, Alpha and Omega)

Later life

World War I marked a deep break in Harrison's life.  Harrison never visited Italy or Greece after the war: she mostly wrote revisions or synopses of previous publications, and pacifist leanings isolated her.  Upon retiring (in 1922), Harrison briefly lived in Paris, but she returned to London when her health began to fail. During the last two years of her life Harrison was living at 11 Mecklenburgh Square on the fringes of Bloomsbury.

Devotees

The critic Camille Paglia has written of Harrison's influence on her own work. Paglia argues that Harrison's career has been ignored by second-wave feminists, who Paglia thinks object to Harrison's findings and efface the careers of prominent pre–World War II female scholars to bolster their claims of male domination in academe.

Mary Beard's numerous essays and book on Harrison's life, as well as several other biographies of Harrison, have moved the needle however toward much more appreciation of Harrison's achievements, as well as further understanding of the context in which she worked. She remains a controversial figure, with several biographies giving rival accounts of her life and loves.

Tina Passman, in 1993 her article "Out of the Closet and into the Field: Matriculture, the Lesbian Perspective, and Feminist Classics" discussed the neglect of Harrison by the academy, and tied that neglect to an unpopularity of lesbian perspectives in the field.

Works

Greek topics

Books on the anthropological search for the origins of Greek religion and mythology, include:

Prolegomena to the Study of Greek Religion (1903, revised 1908, 1922)
 Primitive Athens as Described by Thucydides (1906)
Heresy and Humanity (1911)
Themis: A Study of the Social Origins of Greek Religion (1912, revised 1927)
Ancient Art and Ritual (1913)
Epilegomena to the Study of Greek Religion (1921)

Essays and reflections

Alpha and Omega (1915)
Reminiscences of a Student's Life (1925)

See also

 History of feminism
 Life-death-rebirth deity
 List of Bloomsbury Group people

Notes

References

Harrison, Jane Ellen. Alpha and Omega. AMS Press: New York, 1973.
 Harrison, Jane Ellen, Prolegomena to the Study of Greek Religion, second edition, Cambridge: Cambridge University Press, 1908. Internet Archive
Peacock, Sandra J. Jane Ellen Harrison: The Mask and the Self. Halliday Lithograph Corp.: West Hanover, MA. 1988.
Robinson, Annabel. The Life and Work of Jane Ellen Harrison. Oxford: Oxford University Press, 2002. The first substantial biography, with extensive quotes from personal letters.

Further reading

Barnard-Cogno, Camille. "Jane Harrison (1850–1928), between German and English Scholarship," European Review of History, Vol. 13, Issue 4. (2006), pp. 661–676.
Beard, Mary. The Invention of Jane Harrison (Harvard University Press, 2000); 
Stewart, Jessie G. Jane Ellen Harrison: a Portrait from Letters 1959. A memoir based on her voluminous correspondence with Gilbert Murray.

External links

, densely packed with information; extensive references
Newnham College Archives of Jane Ellen Harrison holds her personal correspondence; brief biography
Jane Harrison by Theo van Rysselberghe at the NPG
 
 
 
Essays by Harrison at Quotidiana.org
Themis: A Study of the Social Origins of Greek Religion by Jane Ellen Harrison, 1912 – online copy at the University of Chicago Library
Prolegomena to the Study of Greek Religion (2nd ed. 1908)
Epilegomena to the Study of Greek Religion (1921)
Primitive Athens as described by Thucydides (1906)
Introductory Studies in Greek Art (1902)

1850 births
1928 deaths
19th-century English non-fiction writers
19th-century linguists
19th-century British women scientists
19th-century British women writers
19th-century atheists
20th-century English non-fiction writers
20th-century linguists
20th-century British women writers
20th-century atheists
Alumni of Newnham College, Cambridge
Bisexual women
Bisexual feminists
British bisexual writers
British women academics
English atheists
English classical scholars
Women classical scholars
English essayists
English suffragists
Fellows of Newnham College, Cambridge
Linguists from England
Women linguists
Mythographers
People from Cottingham, East Riding of Yorkshire
English rhetoricians
Scholars of Greek mythology and religion
British women essayists
19th-century essayists
20th-century essayists